The Grist Mill and Gardens Historic Site, located in the Similkameen River Valley near the Village of Keremeos, is a heritage site owned by the Province of British Columbia. It is located just north of the junction of the Crowsnest Highway and Highway 3A.

The site consists of a working waterwheel-powered grist mill building constructed in 1877 with its historic milling machinery, an historic general store and residence, and an apple house/root cellar as well as several other modern or replica structures.

History

References

Heritage sites in British Columbia
Open-air museums in Canada
Museums in British Columbia
Flour mills in Canada
Buildings and structures in British Columbia
1877 establishments in Canada